Qingdao Liuting International Airport  was the main airport that served the city of Qingdao in Shandong Province, China. A replacement airport, Qingdao Jiaodong International Airport, opened on 12 August 2021.

History
From 2004 to 2006, the airport underwent an expansion of its terminal as well as adding more parking spaces which was part of its initial 2010 goal to expand Liuting Airport to handle 5.2 million passengers annually or 2400 passengers and almost 120,000 tons of cargo hourly. The runway was also extended to its current length. Its IATA code is used for its former romanized name Tsingtao.

In 2018, Qingdao Liuting was the 15th busiest airport in China with 24.53 million passengers. Due to its lack of room to expand as it is being surrounded by the city, in December 2013, the Chinese government approved the construction of Qingdao Jiaodong International Airport. All flights were transferred to Jiaodong Airport when it opened on August 12, 2021.

Qingdao did not have a non-stop intercontinental air link until 29 March 2016, when Lufthansa's existing service to Frankfurt, Germany via Shenyang was upgraded to a non-stop flight to Frankfurt. Later in the year, Beijing Capital Airlines introduced service to Melbourne, Australia and Vancouver, Canada in early 2017.

Statistics

Access

Metro
Liuting station (Qingdao Metro Line 1), opened in December 2020.

See also

List of airports in China
China's busiest airports by passenger traffic

References

External links

Official website

Defunct airports in China
Airports in Shandong
Transport in Qingdao
1982 establishments in China
2021 disestablishments in China
Airports established in 1982
Airports disestablished in 2021